The 2022 United Women's Soccer season is the 28th season of pro-am women's soccer in the United States, and the sixth season of the UWS league.

Standings

Central Conference

Great Lakes Division

Midwest Division

Heartland Division

East Conference

Mid-Atlantic Division

New England Division

Penn-NY Division

Southern Conference

Southeast Division

Southwest Division

West Conference

West Division

Playoffs

References

External links 
 

2021
1